Swimming (Spanish:Natación), for the 2013 Bolivarian Games, took place from 17 November to 20 November 2013.

Medal table
Key:

Medal summary

Men

Women

References

Events at the 2013 Bolivarian Games
2013 in swimming
2013 Bolivarian Games